National Route 427 is a national highway of Japan connecting Nishiwaki, Hyōgo and Asago, Hyōgo in Japan, with a total length of 96.9 km (60.21 mi). The southern end of the road connects with Route 175 and the northern end with Route 9.

References

National highways in Japan
Roads in Hyōgo Prefecture